"Leaf by Niggle" is a short story written by J. R. R. Tolkien in 1938–39 and first published in the Dublin Review in January 1945. It can be found, most notably, in Tolkien's book titled Tree and Leaf, and in other places (including the collections The Tolkien Reader, Poems & Stories, A Tolkien Miscellany, and Tales from the Perilous Realm). This is notable because the book, consisting of a seminal essay called "On Fairy-Stories" and "Leaf by Niggle", offers the underlying philosophy (Creation and Sub-Creation, see below) of much of Tolkien's fantastical writings.

"Leaf by Niggle" is often seen as an allegory of Tolkien's own creative process, and, to an extent, of his own life.

Plot summary
In this story, an artist, named Niggle, lives in a society that does not value art. Working only to please himself, he paints a canvas of a great Tree with a forest in the distance. He invests each and every leaf of his tree with obsessive attention to detail, making every leaf uniquely beautiful. Niggle ends up discarding all his other artworks, or tacks them onto the main canvas, which becomes a single vast embodiment of his vision.

However, there are many mundane chores and duties that prevent Niggle from giving his work the attention it deserves, so it remains incomplete and is not fully realised.

At the back of his head, Niggle knows that he has a great trip looming, and he must pack and prepare his bags.

Also, Niggle's next door neighbour, a gardener named Parish, frequently drops by asking for various forms of help. Parish is lame and has a sick wife and genuinely needs help. Niggle, having a good heart, takes time out to help—but he is also reluctant because he would rather work on his painting. Niggle has other pressing work duties as well that require his attention. Then Niggle himself catches a chill doing errands for Parish in the rain.

Eventually, Niggle is forced to take his trip, and cannot get out of it. He has not prepared, and as a result ends up in a kind of institution, in which he must perform menial labour each day. Back at the home to which he cannot return, Niggle's painting is abandoned, used to patch a damaged roof, and all but destroyed (except for the one perfect leaf of the story's title, which is placed in the local museum).

In time, Niggle is paroled from the institution, and he is sent to a place "for a little gentle treatment". He discovers that this new place is the country of the Tree and Forest of his great painting. This place is the true realisation of his vision, not the flawed and incomplete version in his painting.

Niggle is reunited with his old neighbour, Parish, who now proves his worth as a gardener, and together they make the Tree and Forest even more beautiful. Finally, Niggle journeys farther and deeper into the Forest, and beyond into the great Mountains that he only faintly glimpsed in his painting.

Long after both Niggle and Parish have taken their journeys, the lovely place that they created together becomes a destination for many travelers to visit before their final voyage into the Mountains, and it earns the name "Niggle's Parish".

Analysis
One religious reading of Leaf by Niggle could lead to the conclusion that the allegory of "Leaf by Niggle" is life, death, purgatory and paradise.  Niggle is not prepared for his unavoidable trip, as humans often are not prepared for death. His time in the institution and subsequent discovery of his Tree represent purgatory and heaven.

But Leaf by Niggle can also be interpreted as an illustration of Tolkien's religious philosophy of creation and sub-creation. In this philosophy, true creation is the exclusive province of God, and those who aspire to creation can only make echoes (good) or mockeries (evil) of truth. The sub-creation of works that echo the true creations of God is one way that mortals honour God.

This philosophy is evident in Tolkien's other works, especially The Silmarillion—one Vala, Morgoth, creates the Orc race as a foul mockery of the elf. Another Vala, Aulë, creates the Dwarf race as an act of subcreation that honoured Eru Ilúvatar (the analog of God in Tolkien's writings), and which Eru accepted and made real, just as Niggle's Tree was made real.

Niggle's yearnings after truth and beauty (God's creations) are echoed in his great painting. After death, Niggle is rewarded with the realisation (the making-real) of his yearning; or, alternatively, Niggle's Tree always existed and he simply echoed it in his art. From a metanarrative viewpoint, Tolkien's Arda is itself a subcreation designed to honour the true stories of the real world. Thus, the Middle-earth legendarium, despite its lack of overt religious elements, can be interpreted as a profoundly religious work.

An autobiographical interpretation places Tolkien himself as Niggle—in mundane matters as well as spiritual ones. Tolkien was compulsive in his writing, his revision, his desire for perfection in form and in the "reality" of his invented world, its languages, its chronologies, its existence. Like Niggle, Tolkien came to abandon other projects or graft them onto his "Tree", Middle-earth. Like Niggle, Tolkien faced many chores and duties that kept him from the work he loved; and like Niggle, Tolkien was a horrible procrastinator.

Tolkien himself might have disagreed with an allegorical interpretation. He wrote, in Letter 131 of The Letters of J. R. R. Tolkien, "I dislike Allegory". In specific reference to Niggle, he wrote in Letter 241, "It is not really or properly an 'allegory' so much as 'mythical'." On the other hand, in Letter 153 he said, "I tried to show allegorically how [subcreation] might come to be taken up into Creation in some plane in my 'purgatorial' story Leaf by Niggle."

Footnotes

External links
Leaf by Niggle – a symbolic story about a small painter
Essay on "Leaf by Niggle"

1945 short stories
Short stories by J. R. R. Tolkien
Fantasy short stories
Metafictional works
Works originally published in Dublin Review (Catholic periodical)